Anton I. Arion (1824–1897) was a Romanian politician who served as the Minister of Interior from 12 August 1868 until 16 November 1868.

1824 births
Romanian Ministers of Interior
Romanian Ministers of Justice
1897 deaths
Place of birth missing